Alina Stremous (born 11 July 1995) is a Russian-born Moldovan biathlete who competed at the 2022 Winter Olympics. She won the 10 km pursuit event at the 2022 IBU Open European Championships.

Personal life
Stremous was born in Kotelnikovo, Russia. She studied at State Budgetary Secondary School No. 3, Saint Petersburg.

Career
Stremous started cross-country skiing in Volgograd, Russia, and later moved to Saint Petersburg. In 2017, she started competing for the St. Petersburg Biathlon Sports Federation. She made her international debut in the 2019–20 Biathlon IBU Cup event in Minsk, Belarus. In April 2020, Stremous started competing for Moldova, as she had been unable to make the Russian reserve team. She had not competed internationally for Russia, and so did not need permission from the Russian Biathlon Union to make the nationality change. She was one of a number of Russian-born athletes who chose to represent Moldova.

Stremous came fourth in the 2020–21 Biathlon IBU Cup event in Arber, Germany. At the 2022 IBU Open European Championships, she won the 10 km pursuit event, by 18 seconds. She had four penalties in the competition. At the same Championships, she came second in the 15 km individual event, and fourth in the 7.5 km sprint race.

Stremous qualified for the 2022 Winter Olympics; she was one of four Moldovan biathletes at the Games. She came 10th in the women's sprint event and 16th in the pursuit race. She missed two of her 10 targets in the pursuit race. She also finished 37th in the 15km individual event, and was the country's flag bearer at the closing ceremony.

References

1995 births
Living people
Moldovan female biathletes
Moldovan people of Russian descent
People from Kotelnikovsky District
Biathletes at the 2022 Winter Olympics
Olympic biathletes of Moldova
Sportspeople from Volgograd Oblast